Chahar Mahal (also Romanized as Chahār Maḩāl and Chahār Maḩall) is a village in Rudhaleh Rural District, Rig District, Ganaveh County, Bushehr Province, Iran. At the 2006 census, its population was 471, in 106 families.

References 

Populated places in Ganaveh County